Mateusz Cierniak (born on 3 October 2002) is an international speedway rider from Poland.

Speedway career 
In 2021, Cierniak finished second in the Krosno round of the World Under 21 Championship. He was denied the chance to compete for the title itself after only being allowed to compete in one of the three rounds because he was not listed as one of the original qualified riders. 

Cierniak won the gold medal at the World Under-21 Championship in the 2022 SGP2 and the World U-21 Team  Championship. Also in 2022, he helped Lublin win the 2022 Ekstraliga.

References 

Living people
2002 births
Polish speedway riders